Ledford High School is a public high school in Thomasville, North Carolina. It is part of the Davidson County Schools system and serves parts of Thomasville, Wallburg, High Point, Winston-Salem, and Kernersville areas.

Administration
Principal: Matt Coloton
Assistant principals: Zsaquia Green, Warren Munger

Feeder schools
Friendship Elementary 
Hasty Elementary
Wallburg Elementary 
Ledford Middle

Athletics
Ledford is a member of the 3A Mid Piedmont Conference.  Ledford’s main rivals are North Davidson and Oak Grove. 

Sports Ledford offers:
Baseball
Basketball
Cross country
Football
Golf
Soccer
Softball
Swimming
Tennis
Track and field
Volleyball
Wrestling

State Championship Appearances

1981 1A/2A Women's Volleyball State Champs
1981 1A/2A Women's Softball Slow Pitch State Champs 
1983 1A/2A Women's Softball Slow Pitch State Runner-Ups 
1984 Women's Volleyball State Champs 
1991 2A Women's Softball Slow Pitch State Champs 
1992 2A Men's Basketball State Runner-Up State Finals (1992 2A Men's Basketball - Team Academic State Champions)
1992 2A Men's Golf State Champs
1995 2A Women's Basketball State Champs; MVP Stacey Hinkle
1995 2A Women's Softball State Champs
1996 2A Women's Softball State Champs
1997 2A Women's Basketball State Champs; MVP Stacey Hinkle
1998 2A Women's Basketball State Runners-up
2000 2A Women's Basketball State Champs; MVP Lindsay Smith
2002 2A Women's Basketball State Champs; MVP Leslie Hinkle
2005 2A Men's Golf State Champs
2006 2A Men's Golf State Champs
2007 2A Men's Golf State Champs
2008 2A Men's Golf Runners-up
2011 3A Women's Golf State Champs
2012 3A Women's Golf State Champs
2013 3A Women's Golf State Champs
2018 2A Men's Baseball State Runners-up
2019 2A Men’s Tennis Doubles State Champs
2019 2A Women's Track 4 X 400m Relay State Champions
2021 2A Men’s Tennis Doubles State Champs
2021 2A Men’s 4 x 400m Relay State Champs

Conference Cup Champs

 1990–91 2A Central Carolina Conference 
 1991–92 2A Central Carolina Conference
 1993–94 2A Central Carolina Conference
 1994–95 2A Central Carolina Conference 
 1995–96 2A Central Carolina Conference
 1996–97 2A Central Carolina Conference
 1998–99 2A Central Carolina Conference
 1999–00 2A Central Carolina Conference
 2002–03 2A Central Carolina Conference 
 2006–07 2A Central Carolina Conference 
 2011–12 3A Mid Piedmont Conference 
 2012–13 3A Mid Piedmont Conference 
 2013–14 3A Mid Piedmont Conference
 2014–15 3A Mid Piedmont Conference 
 2015–16 3A Mid Piedmont Conference 
 2016–17 3A Mid Piedmont Conference
 2017–18 2A Central Carolina Conference 
 2018–19 2A Central Carolina Conference

Cheerleading State Champs

 1996 2A State Champs
 2002 2A State Champs
 2003 2A State Champs
 2004 2A State Champs
 2005 2A State Champs
 2006 2A State Champs
 2007 2A State Champs
 2008 2A State Champs
 2010 3A State Champs

Wachovia Cup
1985 2A Wachovia Cup  Winners (Best overall sports programs in 2A) 
1991 2A Wachovia Cup Winners (Best Overall sports programs in 2A)

Music
Ledford Senior High School offers a variety of music programs to its students, such as chorus, concert band, marching band, an indoor percussion ensemble and an honors band. The Ledford Senior High School marching band, also known as The Panther Regiment, has had many successful marching seasons.

Notable alumni
Madison Hedgecock – NFL fullback and Super Bowl XLII Champion with the New York Giants
Erin Hendricks – Miss North Carolina Teen USA 2003
Brad Hoover – NFL fullback for the Carolina Panthers
Jessica Jacobs – Miss North Carolina USA 2007 
Harrison Rhodes — NASCAR driver
Steve Videtich – professional arena league football kicker for the Utah Blaze
Jill Wagner – actress and television show host; former co-host of Wipeout

References

External links
 

Public high schools in North Carolina
Schools in Davidson County, North Carolina